The sixth season of Tyler Perry's House of Payne began airing on January 20, 2012 and ended, with the series finale, on August 10, 2012, until revival in 2020. It stars LaVan Davis as Curtis Payne, Cassi Davis as Ella Payne, Allen Payne as CJ Payne, Lance Gross as Calvin Payne, Demetria McKinney as Janine Payne, Keshia Knight Pulliam as Miranda Payne and Palmer Williams Jr. who joins the cast as Floyd Jackson, and consists of 42 episodes. It also stars Larramie "Doc" Shaw as Malik and China Anne McClain as Jazmine  who are both in a limited number of episodes due to the shows that they also starred in Pair of Kings and A.N.T. Farm.

Episodes

Tyler Perry's House of Payne seasons
2011 American television seasons